Markus Grübel (born 15 October 1959) is a German politician of the Christian Democratic Union (CDU) who has been serving as a member of the Bundestag from the state of Baden-Württemberg since 2002.

Political career 
Grübel first became a member of the Bundestag in the 2002 German federal election.

From 2002 until 2013, Grübel served on the Committee on Family Affairs, Senior Citizens, Women and Youth. In addition to his work in parliament, he chaired an independent inquiry into allegations of child abuse involving the Roman Catholic Diocese of Rottenburg-Stuttgart from 2011 until 2014.

In the negotiations to form a Grand Coalition of Chancellor Angela Merkel's Christian Democrats (CDU together with the Bavarian CSU) and the SPD following the 2013 federal elections, Grübel was part of the CDU/CSU delegation in the working group on families, women and equality, led by Annette Widmann-Mauz and Manuela Schwesig.

From 2013 until 2018, Grübel served as Parliamentary State Secretary at the Federal Ministry of Defence under the leadership of minister Ursula von der Leyen. In addition to his work in parliament, he chaired an independent inquiry into allegations of child abuse involving the Roman Catholic Diocese of Rottenburg-Stuttgart from 2011 until 2014.

From 2018 to 2021, Grübel was a member of the Committee on Foreign Affairs and the Subcommittee on Civilian Crisis Prevention. In addition to his committee assignments, he has been a member of the German delegation to the Franco-German Parliamentary Assembly from 2019. Since 2021 elections, he has been serving on the Defence Committee.

Other activities 
 Center for International Peace Operations (ZIF), Member of the Supervisory Board

Political positions
In June 2017, Grübel voted against Germany's introduction of same-sex marriage.

Ahead of the 2021 national elections, Grübel endorsed Markus Söder as the Christian Democrats' joint candidate to succeed Chancellor Angela Merkel.

References

External links 

  
 Bundestag biography 

1959 births
Living people
Members of the Bundestag for Baden-Württemberg
Members of the Bundestag 2021–2025
Members of the Bundestag 2017–2021
Members of the Bundestag 2013–2017
Members of the Bundestag 2009–2013
Members of the Bundestag 2005–2009
Members of the Bundestag 2002–2005
Members of the Bundestag for the Christian Democratic Union of Germany